is a city located in Kagoshima Prefecture, Japan.

The modern city of Ichikikushikino was established on October 11, 2005, from the merger of the city of Kushikino with the town of Ichiki (from Hioki District).

At the end of January 2013, the city had an estimated population of 30,551, with 13,505 households. The total area is 112.02 km². The city also celebrates an annual maguro festival.

Geography

Surrounding municipalities
Satsumasendai
Hioki

Sister cities
 Salinas, California

References

External links
 Ichikikushikino City official website 

Cities in Kagoshima Prefecture
Populated coastal places in Japan